Paul Grubenthal (5 August 1932 – 30 March 1995) was an Austrian gymnast. He competed in eight events at the 1952 Summer Olympics.

References

External links
 

1932 births
1995 deaths
Austrian male artistic gymnasts
Olympic gymnasts of Austria
Gymnasts at the 1952 Summer Olympics
Place of birth missing
20th-century Austrian people